The Kaugel River is a river in Western Highlands Province, Papua New Guinea. With a total length of  it is one of the major tributary of Purari River.

See also
List of rivers of Papua New Guinea
Kaugel language
Kaugel River languages

References

Rivers of Papua New Guinea